Mickey Gilley was an American country music artist. His discography consists of 28 studio albums, 13 compilation albums, two live albums, 54 singles, and five music videos. 46 of his singles charted on the Billboard Hot Country Songs chart between 1968 and 1989, including 17 number one hits.

Studio albums

1960s and 1970s

1980s–2010s

Compilation albums

Live albums

Singles

1950s–1970s

1980s

As featured artist

Music videos

Notes

References

External links

Country music discographies
 
 
Discographies of American artists